Douglas Symons is a Canadian former politician, who served as a BC Liberal Member of the Legislative Assembly of British Columbia from 1991 to 2001, representing the riding of Richmond Centre.

Symons was educated at the University of British Columbia, receiving a B.Ed. Before entering politics, he taught school for 29 years.

References

British Columbia Liberal Party MLAs
Living people
People from Richmond, British Columbia
Politicians from Regina, Saskatchewan
Year of birth missing (living people)